James Hendrick Rooney (1897 – November 24, 1969) was a Canadian politician. He was elected to the House of Commons of Canada as a Member of the Liberal Party in the riding of St. Paul's in the 1949 election, and served until 1953.

External links 
 

1897 births
1969 deaths
Liberal Party of Canada MPs
Members of the House of Commons of Canada from Ontario
People from Cobourg
Politicians from Toronto